The .950 JDJ (24.1×70mm) is a powerful large caliber rifle cartridge developed by American gunsmith and weapon designer J. D. Jones of SSK Industries.

Cartridge

.950 JDJ cases are approximately 70 mm in length, and are based on a 20×110mm case shortened and necked up to accept the  bullet.  Projectiles are custom-made and most commonly weigh  which is 8.2 ounces or over half a pound.

Rifles

SSK received a "Sporting Use Exception" to de-regulate the rifles. Thus, in the United States, they can be owned like any other Title I rifle by an American citizen at age 18. The rifles use McMillan Firearms stocks and extraordinarily thick Krieger barrels bearing an  muzzle brake. Despite the weight, recoil is significant and shooters must be sure to choose components (i.e., scopes and bipods) that can handle the force. The sheer size, weight, and power of these rifles make them rather impractical for hunting use. SSK only manufactured three of these rifles and as of 2014 no longer produces the ammunition.

Ballistics

Even the .50 BMG, which has a kinetic energy of around  delivers less than half the energy.

Shooting usually involves a heavy "lead sled" or similar shooting rest, and the rifle scope has significant eye relief to avoid injuring the ocular orbit.

References

Pistol and rifle cartridges
Large-caliber cartridges
JDJ cartridges